"Brand New Lover" is a song recorded by English pop band Dead or Alive. It was the lead single released from the band's third studio album, Mad, Bad and Dangerous to Know on Epic Records. It achieved international success when released as a single in 1986.

Background
Following a fraught six-month recording session with producers Stock Aitken Waterman, which was marked by fights and disagreements between the band, record company and producers over the sound of their new material, singer Pete Burns claimed he struggled to get Epic to commit to a release schedule for the single. He said this changed when Bananarama had major success with their Dead or Alive-inspired cover of "Venus", which Burns claimed encouraged the label to schedule "Brand New Lover" for release.

While the song was a major hit in a number of territories, including the United States and Japan, in the UK the single significantly underperformed, failing to crack the top 20. Burns blamed the song's disappointing run in his home country on his then-ongoing war with his UK label, alleging that the company had failed to press and distribute enough copies of the single to make it a hit, and claiming the band had lost out on 67,000 UK sales as a result.

The song features western motifs, with lyrics that describe the singer's desire to leave his current partner for one who is more exciting. His motivation is that he admittedly does not desire a stable relationship with one partner, but rather is "a pleasure seeker."

Track listing

Chart performance
The song proved to be more successful in the U.S. and in Japan than in the band's native UK, where it reached No. 31. In the US, "Brand New Lover" peaked at No. 15 on the Billboard Hot 100 chart (The band's second and last single to reach the top 20), and spent two weeks at No. 1 on the American dance chart in December 1986.

References

External links
 

1986 singles
1986 songs
Dead or Alive (band) songs
Music videos directed by Vaughan Arnell
Song recordings produced by Stock Aitken Waterman
Songs written by Pete Burns
Songs written by Tim Lever
Songs written by Mike Percy (musician)
Epic Records singles
Hi-NRG songs